Don Gillis may refer to:

 Don Gillis (composer) (1912–1978), American composer, conductor and teacher
 Don Gillis (sportscaster) (1922–2008), American radio and television personality
 Don Gillis, musical director for the television series Fraggle Rock

See also
Donald Gillies (disambiguation)